End, END, Ending, or variation, may refer to:

End
In mathematics:
End (category theory)
End (topology)
End (graph theory)
End (group theory) (a subcase of the previous)
End (endomorphism)
In sports and games
End (gridiron football)
End, a division of play in the sports of curling, target archery and pétanque
End (dominoes), one of the halves of the face of a domino tile 
In entertainment:
End (band) an American hardcore punk supergroup formed in 2017.
End key on a modern computer keyboard
End Records, a record label
"End", a song by The Cure from Wish
 Ends (song) (1998 song) song by Everlast, off the album Whitey Ford Sings the Blues
In other areas:
End, in weaving, a single thread of the warp
Ends (short story collection) (1988 book) anthology of Gordon R. Dickson stories

END
 European Nuclear Disarmament
 Endoglin, a glycoprotein
 Equivalent narcotic depth, a concept used in underwater diving
 Environmental noise directive

Ending
Ending (linguistics), a linguistic morpheme
Alternate ending
End of a part of a baseball game
Chess endgame
Ending credits
Post-credits scene
False ending
Happy ending
Multiple endings
Twist ending
Endings (film), a 2012 film
The Ending (Song), a 2012 song by Ellie Goulding off the album Halcyon
This Ending (band) Swedish extreme metal band
A repeat sign, in music theory

ENDS
 ENDS, electronic nicotine delivery system; see electronic cigarette

See also

 The End (disambiguation)
 
 
 
 
 
 Telos (philosophy), a goal or final state
 Conclude (disambiguation)
 End of the world (disambiguation)
 Finale (disambiguation)
 Front end (disambiguation)
 Terminate (disambiguation)